Oak Hill Cemetery may refer to:

Florida
 Oak Hill Cemetery (Bartow, Florida), listed on the NRHP in Polk County
 Oak Hill Cemetery (Lake Placid, Florida)

Georgia (US)
 Oak Hill Cemetery (Cartersville, Georgia)
 Oak Hill Cemetery (Newnan, Georgia), listed on the NRHP in Coweta County

Michigan
 Oak Hill Cemetery (Battle Creek, Michigan)
 Oak Hill Cemetery (Grand Rapids, Michigan)
 Oak Hill Cemetery (Pontiac, Michigan), listed on the NRHP in Oakland County

New York
 Oak Hill Cemetery (Oak Hill, New York), listed on the NRHP in Greene County
 Oak Hill Cemetery (Herkimer, New York), see Robert Earl (judge)
 Oak Hill Cemetery (Stony Brook, New York), see Joseph Reboli

Other states
 Oak Hill Cemetery (Birmingham, Alabama), listed on the National Register of Historic Places (NRHP) in Jefferson County
 Oak Hill Cemetery (Washington, D.C.)
 Oak Hill Cemetery (Lewistown, Illinois), listed on the NRHP in Fulton County
 Oak Hill Cemetery (Evansville, Indiana), listed on the NRHP in Vanderburgh County
 Oak Hill Cemetery (Lebanon, Indiana)
 Oak Hill Cemetery (Cedar Rapids, Iowa), listed on the NRHP in Linn County
 Oak Hill Cemetery (Galena, Kansas), see William Frederick Sapp
 Oak Hill Cemetery (Winona, Mississippi), see Thomas U. Sisson
 Oak Hill Cemetery (Janesville, Rock County, Wisconsin), see George Morton Randall
 Oak Hill Memorial Park, San Jose, California

See also
Oak Hill Cemetery Chapel (disambiguation)